The dirtbag left is a style of left-wing politics that eschews civility to convey a left-wing populist and anti-capitalist message using vulgarity. It is most closely associated with American left-wing media that emerged in the mid-2010s, such as the podcast Chapo Trap House.

Origins 

The term was coined by Amber A'Lee Frost and is associated with her essay "The Necessity of Political Vulgarity", published in Current Affairs in 2016. While the essay does not directly use the term dirtbag left, it mounts a defense of politics that uses "vulgarity as a tool for fighting the powerful", citing libelles used to slander Marie Antoinette, Cohen v. California, and N.W.A's protest song "Fuck tha Police", among others. Frost writes that vulgarity in itself is not "inherently subversive", but argues that the left must reclaim vulgarity "from the Trumps of the world", lest it be "handicapped by [its] own civility."

The dirtbag left is most closely associated with the American politics podcast Chapo Trap House, which Frost co-hosted. Chapo emerged in 2016 in the context of the 2016 Democratic Party presidential primaries and subsequent presidential election. It combines political analysis and punditry from a socialist perspective with elements of comedy and irony, in the style of a shock jock. Chapo gained attention for its criticism of both the Republican and Democratic parties, particularly what the podcast claimed was the Democratic Party's complicity with a conservative agenda.

Beyond Chapo, media outlets that have been alternately linked to or described as dirtbag left include the podcasts Street Fight Radio, TrueAnon, Red Scare, Cum Town, the publications The Baffler and Current Affairs, and Twitch streamer Hasan Piker. These outlets are noted as presenting comedy as "applied to an ideological reading of the news of the day, with a particular focus on political feeling or style."

Tenets and rhetorical style 

The dirtbag left has been described as an anti-fascist, anti-conservative, anti-centrist, and anti-liberal ideology. It has been linked to a variety of political stances, including anti-political correctness; anti-inequality; a disregard for civility; opposition to the wealthy and support for redistributive economic policies; and support for both the 2016 and 2020 presidential campaigns of Bernie Sanders.

The Iraq War and 2008 financial crisis have been cited as particular radicalizing events for the dirtbag left.

Rhetorically, the dirtbag left is noted as a vulgar, "bawdy offensive balance to cautious mainstream liberal politics", with "a dismissive attitude towards the niceties of liberal political correctness" that frequently direct insults and attacks through social media at specific public figures with political or economic power. The Times (London) cited the rise of this rhetorical style as evidence of "the limitations of wokeness as a political force" and an example of the changing nature of politics on the internet.

Despite the connotations of the term "dirtbag left", its use is not typically considered derogatory, with The New York Times calling the term "a defense mechanism that doubles as a nickname." Self-identification with the term is indicative of the dirtbag left's tendency toward irony and self-deprecation, with Frost noting that the term "speaks to a lot of people who have been dismissed or chided by liberals for embracing vulgarity, eschewing sanctimony or piety, and refusing to be civil to the right wing", adding that the term "says something positive about what we do believe, and what we’re willing to ruthlessly fight for, regardless of established etiquette." Chapo co-host Will Menaker joked that "if you sleep on a mattress on the floor and fuck in a sleeping bag, then you just might be the dirtbag left", before explaining that he sees the dirtbag left as a "scurrilous and funny approach to left-wing politics" that contrasts "utterly humorless and bloodless" liberalism.

Criticism 

Writer Amanda Marcotte argued that the ideology is linked to "that male privilege of intimidating people into assuming you're cool" and comparing it to the television series Jackass. Writer Jeet Heer argued that the dirtbag left is a form of "doomed to fail" dominance politics, arguing that "derision is useful for one half of politics—defeating the opposing party—but has nothing to say to the crucial other half of forming alliances that can govern effectively for the people."

References 

2016 neologisms
2010s neologisms
American political neologisms
Left-wing populism in the United States
Socialism in the United States
Youth politics in the United States